The following is a list of Nippon Professional Baseball players with the last name starting with E, retired or active.

E
Nobuyuki Ebisu
Angel Echevarria
Suguru Egawa
Tomoaki Egawa
Ryosuke Eguchi
Takayoshi Eguchi
Hirotaka Egusa
Akira Ejiri
Shintaro Ejiri
Narciso Elvira
Yutaka Enatsu
Masataka Endoh
Ryohei Endoh
Ryuji Endoh
Yasuhiro Enoki
Masaaki Esaka
Akira Etoh
Shinichi Etoh
Tom Evans

References

External links
Japanese Baseball

 E